The Changan Alsvin V3 is a subcompact sedan produced by Chinese auto maker Changan Automobile.

Overview
Previewed by the Changan B501 concept, the production version Alsvin V3 subcompact sedan debuted at the 2011 Guangzhou Auto Show. Later actually listed as the Alsvin 100 or Yuexiang 100, and finally with the confirmed name of Alsvin V3 when launched on to the market in June 2012. Price ranges from 43.900 to 48.900 yuan.
The Changan Alsvin V3 is a subcompact sedan slightly smaller and positioned under the Changan Alsvin/Changan Alsvin V5 in the market, and is built on a different platform employing multi-link independent suspension in the rear. The Alsvin V3 is powered by a 1.3 liter inline-4 16V DOHC engine producing 69kW and 121Nm with a 5-speed manual transmission as the only gearbox option.

Deliveries of the Alsvin V3 started on June 20, 2012. In 2013, 76,858 units were sold and 70,143 deliveries were made in 2014.

Facelift
A facelift debuted on the 2014 Guangzhou Auto Show with a launch on the Chinese car market at Q1 2015. The facelift focuses on the front with a new grille similar to the ones on the Alsvin V7. The post-facelift model adds a 1.4 liter EA14 inline-four engine and a 5-speed automatic transmission as additional options.

References

External links 

 – Changan Official website

Cars introduced in 2012
2010s cars
Cars of China
Front-wheel-drive vehicles
Alsvin V3
Subcompact cars
Sedans